The Poland men's national basketball team represents Poland in international basketball competitions. They are controlled by the Polish Basketball Federation (PZKosz).

Poland has competed at the EuroBasket on 28 occasions, with their best performance at the tournament coming in 1963, as hosts, finishing as runners-up. Poland has competed six times at the Olympic Games, with their best finish being fourth place at the first edition of the event in 1936. Poland have also made two appearances at the FIBA World Cup, with their first coming in 1967, and their second occurring 52 years later in 2019.

History

1936 Olympic Games
The 1936 Summer Olympics was the first tournament Poland took part in. They eventually placed an impressive fourth at the event, in the then 23 team tournament.

EuroBasket 1937
The EuroBasket 1937 in Riga, marked the first ever appearance for the national team at the European Basketball Championship. In the preliminary round the Poles dropped their first match to France, but rebounded with victories against Latvia and Czechoslovakia. They finished with an 2–1 record, and moved on to the semi-finals where they played Lithuanaia. There they were defeated by the eventual champion Lithuanian squad 31–25, relegating them to the bronze medal match. For the bronze, the team was defeated again by France to end their maiden run at the Eurobasket.

EuroBasket 1939
Two years later at EuroBasket 1939 in Kaunas, the competition format was a single round-robin without playoffs. Latvia and Lithuania both defeated Poland whereas the other five teams in the competition fell to the Poles.  With Lithuania undefeated and Poland and Latvia tied with a record of 5–2, the loss to Latvia was decisive in pushing Poland to third place and the bronze.

EuroBasket 1946
Due to World War II, the next European basketball championship was at EuroBasket 1946 in Geneva. The Poles started well, with a victory over Luxembourg. They then lost their next two preliminary round matches to Italy, and Hungary to finish in third place of the four-team group. That result put them in the 7th–10th place classification semi-final, where they lost again, this time to Belgium. In the 9th/10th place playoff, Poland defeated England.

EuroBasket 1947
The EuroBasket returned to the odd-year schedule with EuroBasket 1947 in Prague. Poland placed second in their preliminary group, losing only to eventual silver medallist Czechoslovakia en route to a 2–1 record.  They then went 1–2 in their semi-final group, falling to the gold medal Soviet Union team and bronze medal Egypt. This put Poland in a 5th/6th place playoff against France, who had been 1–2 in the opposite semi-final group. France went on to win, 62–29.

EuroBasket 1955
After an 8-year hiatus, Poland returned at EuroBasket 1955 in Budapest. They quickly showed that they could still play with the European field, winning all four of their preliminary round games to advance to the final round. Despite their mediocre 3–4 record in that round, the Poles had demonstrated that they could be effective against the best of the European pool with a 72–68 win over eventual runners-up Czechoslovakia. They eventually finished 5th overall of the 18 teams in the tournament.

EuroBasket 1957
Two years later in Sofia, Poland competed at EuroBasket 1957. Despite being seeded into the same preliminary pool as the Soviet Union, the Poles went 2–1 in the round-robin and advanced to the final round. There they lost their first six of seven games in that round, getting their first win in the last game of the round, against France to finish the tournament in 7th place.

EuroBasket 1963
Five years later the national team hosted EuroBasket 1963 in Wroclaw. They got off to a fast start winning their first match against Spain 79–76. They fell to the Soviet Union in their next match. But, eventually ran the table the rest of the way in their preliminary round group to finish with an 6–1 record to advance. In the semi-finals the Poles defeated Yugoslavia, to get within a win of the gold medal. There they met up against the Soviet Union again, and were dominated 61–45 to instead take silver.

1964 Olympic Games
As vice champion of the EuroBasket, at the 1964 Summer Olympics, the Poles came off an impressive start as they finished 3rd out of 8 in the preliminary round. Overall, they finished 6th out of 16, ahead of SFR Yugoslavia, Uruguay and Mexico, which were all major players at the global stage at that time.

1967 World Cup
The 1967 World Cup was the first appearance for the national team to compete at the global tournament. The team finished 2–1 in their preliminary group, with victories against Paraguay and Puerto Rico to advance to the final round. There they finished their first ever trip to the World Cup with an subpar 2–4 record, placing 5th in the event.

1968 Olympic Games
Just like at the last Summer Olympics in Tokyo, the Poles finished the preliminary round at the 1968 event in Mexico City with a winning record. Overall, they finished 6th out of 16. Just like at the EuroBasket 1967, Poland won against Bulgaria for its closest victory of the tournament.

Seventh Heaven (1987-1997)
From 1987 to 1997, the national team only managed to qualify for the European Basketball Championship three times out of a possible six. They finished in seventh place in each tournament in 1987, 1991, and 1997. Although after 1997 Poland would fail to qualify for the top European basketball event for the next decade.

The 10-year span
After years of failed qualifications, Poland finally made their way back to the EuroBasket at the 2007 tournament. It was quite an unexpected achievement for the Poles. But, overall they did not make much noise. Because of injury, many key players including Michał Ignerski and Maciej Lampe did not compete at the event. The Poles lost all 3 games, but even in defeat they remained competitive losing by only 8 to a well-regarded French team and by 9 to the Italian squad.

EuroBasket 2009
The White and Red hosted the EuroBasket 2009, making it the first time the national team qualified for consecutive EuroBasket tournaments since the mid 1980s. They got off to an impressive start putting away Bulgaria in the first game 90–78. The team followed that up with another strong performance versus Lithuania 86–75, before dropping their final game in preliminary play against Turkey. With an 2–1 record the team was able to advance to the second round. There, the team came up short in group play with an 1–4 record and a 9th place finish overall at the event.

Later years (2009-2019)
After 2009, the national team qualified for every EuroBasket in the 2010s. But they could only manage to finish in the top half of the tournament once, that being in 2015.

2019 World Cup 
In 2019, the national team qualified for the World Cup. It was their first qualification to a global event since 1980 Olympics in Moscow. During the 2019 FIBA World Cup, Poland was put into a group with group favourite China, Ivory Coast, and Venezuela. After a convincing win over Venezuela, Poland upset the hosts 79-76 in front of a max-capacity crowd in Beijing. Poland was down 72-69 with 15 seconds left before Chinese NBA center Zhou Qi made 2 straight turnovers allowing Poland to send the game into overtime. Aaron Cel made a driving layup to put Poland up 78-76 and the upset was sealed when Yi Jianlian missed the game-tying shot. Poland finished 3-0 in their group and moved onto the next round, where they defeated Russia 79-74 before losing to Argentina. In the quarterfinals they faced eventual champions Spain and narrowly lost 90-78, eventually finishing the tournament in 8th place.

EuroBasket 2022  
At the EuroBasket 2022 qualification, Jeremy Sochan became the youngest player to ever play for Poland's national team. In his very first game, he led Poland over Romania 88-81. He played 29 minutes in which he scored 18 points, including a four-point play (3 pointer plus foul and free throw) at the end and a game-deciding block.
The Orly played in Group D held in Prague. Poland started off with a win over co-host Czech Republic by 99-84. But in thrir second match, they fell back to Finland by 89-59. They later went back strong with their second win over Israel by 85-76. They won in their fourth match against the Netherlands 69-75. But in the fifth and final preliminary match, lost to Serbia by 96-69. in the knockout stage, they start their Final Phase campaign in the Round of 16 with a win over Ukraine by 86-94. in the quarter-finals, they beat Slovenia by 87-90. But in the semi-finals they were unable to catch up and lost to France by 54-95. In the third place match, Poland fell behind to co-host Germany and lost by 69-82. Poland finished fourth in the final standings, it became Poland's strong finish for the first time since 1967.

EuroBasket 2025  
Poland will co-host the EuroBasket 2025 after being able to step in for Ukraine.  Poland is currently playing in the pre-qualifiers despite already earning an automatic qualification as co-host.

Competitive record

FIBA World Cup

Olympic Games

EuroBasket

Results and fixtures

2021

2022

2023

Team

Current roster
Roster for the EuroBasket 2025 Pre-Qualifiers matches on 23 and 26 February 2023 against Austria and Switzerland.

Depth chart

Head coach history

Past rosters
1936 Olympic Games: finished 4th among 21 teams

1 Zdzisław Filipkiewicz, 2 Florian Grzechowiak, 3 Zdzisław Kasprzak, 4 Jakub Kopf, 5 Ewaryst Łój, 6 Janusz Patrzykont, 7 Andrzej Pluciński, 8 Zenon Różycki, 9 Paweł Stok, 10 Edward Szostak (Coach: Walenty Kłyszejko)

1937 EuroBasket: finished 4th among 8 teams

3 Michał Czajczyk, 4 Stefan Gendera, 5 Florian Grzechowiak, 6 Zdzisław Kasprzak, 7 Janusz Patrzykont, 8 Andrzej Pluciński, 9 Zbigniew Resich, 10 Zenon Różycki, 11 Jarosław Śmigielski, 12 Paweł Stok (Coach: Walenty Kłyszejko)

1939 EuroBasket: finished 3rd  among 8 teams

4 Jerzy Gregołajtis, 5 Bohdan Bartosiewicz, 6 Jarosław Śmigielski, 7 Zbigniew Resich, 8 Florian Grzechowiak, 9 Stanisław Pawłowski, 10 Paweł Stok, 11 Jerzy Rossudowski, 12 Zdzislaw Kasprzak, 13 Ewaryst Loj, 14 Włodzimierz Pławczyk (Coach: Walenty Kłyszejko)

1946 EuroBasket: finished 9th among 10 teams

3 Zbigniew Resich, 4 Rościsław Iwanow-Ruszkiewicz, 5 Jacek Arlet, 6 Jarosław Śmigielski, 7 Franciszek Szymura, 8 Florian Grzechowiak, 9 Edward Jarczyński, 10 Paweł Stok, 12 Zdzisław Kasprzak, 14 Władysław Maleszewski (Coach: Józef Pachla)

1947 EuroBasket: finished 6th among 14 teams

3 Józef Żyliński, 4 Ludwik Barszczewski, 5 Bohdan Bartosiewicz, 6 Jacek Arlet, 7 Jerzy Dowgird, 8 Edward Jarczyński, 9 Henryk Jaźnicki, 10 Paweł Stok, 11 Romuald Markowski, 12 Zbigniew Resich, 13 Tadeusz Ulatowski, 14 Władysław Maleszewski (Coach: Józef Pachla)

1955 EuroBasket: finished 5th among 18 teams

3 Leszek Kamiński, 4 Witold Zagórski, 5 Wincent Wawro, 6 Jerzy Sterenga, 7 Mieczysław Feglerski, 8 Jerzy Mlynarczyk, 9 Bohdan Przywarski, 10 Sławomir Złotkiewicz, 11 Jędrzej Bednarowicz, 12 Stefan Wojcik, 13 Andrzej Nartowski, 14 Tadeusz Pacuła, 16 Władysław Pawlak, 17 Ryszard Olszewski (Coach: Władysław Maleszewski)

1957 EuroBasket: finished 7th among 16 teams

3 Wincent Wawro, 4 Janusz Wichowski, 5 Andrzej Pstrokoński, 6 Andrzej Nartowski, 7 Mieczysław Feglerski, 8 Ryszard Olszewski, 9 Krzysztof Sitkowski, 10 Władysław Pawlak, 11 Jerzy Młynarczyk, 12 Stefan Wojcik, 13 Zdzisław Skrzeczkowski, 14 Tadeusz Pacuła (Coach: Władysław Maleszewski)

1959 EuroBasket: finished 6th among 17 teams

3 Jerzy Piskun, 4 Janusz Wichowski, 5 Andrzej Pstrokoński, 6 Andrzej Nartowski, 7 Bohdan Przywarski, 8 Ryszard Olszewski, 9 Krzysztof Sitkowski, 10 Władysław Pawlak, 11 Jerzy Młynarczyk, 12 Zbigniew Dregier, 13 Zenon Matysik, 14 Tadeusz Pacuła (Coach: Zygmunt Olesiewicz)

1960 Olympic Games: finished 7th among 16 teams

3 Jerzy Piskun, 4 Janusz Wichowski, 5 Andrzej Pstrokoński, 6 Andrzej Nartowski, 7 Jerzy Młynarczyk, 8 Ryszard Olszewski, 9 Krzysztof Sitkowski, 10 Mieczysław Łopatka, 11 Bohdan Przywarski, 12 Zbigniew Dregier, 13 Dariusz Świerczewski, 14 Tadeusz Pacuła (Coach: Zygmunt Olesiewicz)

1961 EuroBasket: finished 9th among 19 teams

4 Janusz Wichowski, 5 Andrzej Pstrokoński, 6 Jerzy Piskun, 7 Jerzy Młynarczyk, 8 Ryszard Olszewski, 9 Krzysztof Sitkowski, 10 Władysław Pawlak, 11 Zygmunt Wysocki, 12 Ryszard Niewodowski, 13 Leszek Arent, 14 Andrzej Nartowski, 15 Stanisław Olejniczak (Coach: Witold Zagórski)

1963 EuroBasket: finished 2nd  among 16 teams

4 Janusz Wichowski, 5 Andrzej Pstrokoński, 6 Leszek Arent, 7 Wiesław Langiewicz, 8 Stanisław Olejniczak, 9 Krzysztof Sitkowski, 10 Jerzy Piskun, 11 Bohdan Likszo, 12 Mieczysław Łopatka, 13 Kazimierz Frelkiewicz, 14 Andrzej Nartowski, 15 Zbigniew Dregier, (Coach: Witold Zagórski)

1964 Olympic Games: finished 6th among 16 teams

4 Janusz Wichowski, 5 Andrzej Pstrokoński, 6 Tadeusz Blauth, 7 Andrzej Perka, 8 Stanisław Olejniczak, 9 Krzysztof Sitkowski, 10 Jerzy Piskun, 11 Bohdan Likszo, 12 Mieczysław Łopatka, 13 Kazimierz Frelkiewicz, 14 Krystian Czernichowski, 15 Zbigniew Dregier (Coach: Witold Zagórski)

1965 EuroBasket: finished 3rd  among 16 teams

4 Janusz Wichowski, 5 Andrzej Pstrokoński, 6 Czesław Malec, 7 Andrzej Perka, 8 Stanisław Olejniczak, 9 Wiesław Langiewicz, 10 Jerzy Piskun, 11 Bohdan Likszo, 12 Mieczysław Łopatka, 13 Kazimierz Frelkiewicz, 14 Edward Grzywna, 15 Zbigniew Dregier (Coach: Witold Zagórski)

1967 FIBA World Cup: finished 5th among 13 teams

4 Janusz Wichowski, 5 Włodzimierz Trams, 6 Czesław Malec, 7 Henryk Cegielski, 8 Igor Oleszkiewicz, 9 Wiesław Langiewicz, 10 Andrzej Chmarzynski, 11 Bohdan Likszo, 12 Mieczysław Łopatka, 13 Kazimierz Frelkiewicz, 14 Bolesław Kwiatkowski, 15 Zbigniew Dregier (Coach: Witold Zagórski)

1967 EuroBasket: finished 3rd  among 16 teams

4 Mirosław Kuczyński, 5 Włodzimierz Trams, 6 Czesław Malec, 7 Henryk Cegielski, 8 Maciej Chojnacki, 9 Waldemar Kozak, 10 Grzegorz Korcz, 11 Bohdan Likszo, 12 Mieczysław Łopatka, 13 Kazimierz Frelkiewicz, 14 Bolesław Kwiatkowski, 15 Zbigniew Dregier (Coach: Witold Zagórski)

1968 Olympic Games: finished 6th among 16 teams

4 Grzegorz Korcz, 5 Włodzimierz Trams, 6 Czesław Malec, 7 Henryk Cegielski, 8 Andrzej Kasprzak, 9 Edward Jurkiewicz, 10 Adam Niemiec, 11 Bohdan Likszo, 12 Mieczysław Łopatka, 13 Kazimierz Frelkiewicz, 14 Bolesław Kwiatkowski, 15 Andrzej Pasiorowski (Coach: Witold Zagórski)

1969 EuroBasket: finished 4th among 12 teams

4 Marek Ladniak, 5 Włodzimierz Trams, 6 Jan Dolczewski, 7 Henryk Cegielski, 8 Andrzej Seweryn, 9 Edward Jurkiewicz, 10 Adam Niemiec, 11 Bohdan Likszo, 12 Waldemar Kozak, 13 Bolesław Kwiatkowski, 14 Krzysztof Gula, 15 Grzegorz Korcz (Coach: Witold Zagórski)

1971 EuroBasket: finished 4th among 12 teams

4 Marek Ladniak, 5 Grzegorz Korcz, 6 Jan Dolczewski, 7 Henryk Cegielski, 8 Andrzej Seweryn, 9 Edward Jurkiewicz, 10 Jerzy Frolow, 11 Janusz Cegliński, 12 Waldemar Kozak, 13 Mirosław Kalinowski, 14 Eugeniusz Durejko, 15 Zbigniew Jedlinski (Coach: Witold Zagórski)

1972 Olympic Games: finished 10th among 16 teams

4 Andrzej Pasiorowski, 5 Grzegorz Korcz, 6 Jan Dolczewski, 7 Franciszek Niemiec, 8 Andrzej Seweryn, 9 Waldemar Kozak, 10 Andrzej Kasprzak, 11 Janusz Cegliński, 12 Mieczysław Łopatka, 13 Ryszard Białowąs, 14 Eugeniusz Durejko, 15 Piotr Langosz (Coach: Witold Zagórski)

1973 EuroBasket: finished 12th among 12 teams

4 Andrzej Pasiorowski, 5 Grzegorz Korcz, 6 Jan Dolczewski, 7 Jerzy Plebanek, 8 Andrzej Seweryn, 9 Tomasz Tybinkowski, 10 Tadeusz Grygiel, 11 Janusz Cegliński, 12 Jacek Kalinowski, 13 Zdzisław Myrda, 14 Eugeniusz Durejko, 15 Piotr Langosz (Coach: Witold Zagórski)

1975 EuroBasket: finished 8th among 12 teams

4 Tadeusz Grygiel, 5 Tomasz Garlinski, 6 Piotr Langosz, 7 Franciszek Niemiec, 8 Andrzej Seweryn, 9 Edward Jurkiewicz, 10 Adam Gardzina, 11 Wojciech Fiedorczuk, 12 Marek Ladniak, 13 Zdzisław Myrda, 14 Eugeniusz Durejko, 15 Dariusz Kwiatkowski (Coach: Witold Zagórski)

1979 EuroBasket: finished 7th among 12 teams

4 Dariusz Zelig, 5 Zbigniew Kudlacz, 6 Wojciech Rosiński, 7 Eugeniusz Kijewski, 8 Andrzej Seweryn, 9 Tomasz Garlinski, 10 Leszek Chudeusz, 11 Justyn Węglorz, 12 Mieczysław Młynarski, 13 Zdzisław Myrda, 14 Ryszard Prostak, 15 Krzysztof Fikiel (Coach: Jerzy Świątek)

1980 Olympic Games: finished 7th among 12 teams

4 Dariusz Zelig, 5 Leszek Doliński, 6 Wojciech Rosiński, 7 Eugeniusz Kijewski, 8 Jerzy Bińkowski, 9 Marcin Michalski, 10 Ireneusz Mulak, 11 Justyn Węglorz, 12 Mieczysław Młynarski, 13 Zdzisław Myrda, 14 Ryszard Prostak, 15 Krzysztof Fikiel (Coach: Stefan Majer)

1981 EuroBasket: finished 7th among 12 teams

4 Dariusz Zelig, 5 Dariusz Szczubial, 6 Wojciech Rosinski, 7 Eugeniusz Kijewski, 8 Zbigniew Bogucki, 9 Jerzy Binkowski, 10 Miroslaw Boryca, 11 Justyn Weglorz, 12 Mieczyslaw Mlynarski, 13 Jaroslaw Jechorek, 14 Ryszard Prostak, 15 Krzysztof Fikiel (Coach: Jerzy Świątek)

1983 EuroBasket: finished 9th among 12 teams

4 Dariusz Zelig, 5 Stanisław Reschke, 6 Stanisław Kiełbik, 7 Eugeniusz Kijewski, 8 Jarosław Jęchorek, 9 Jerzy Bińkowski, 10 Ireneusz Mulak, 11 Justyn Węglorz, 12 Mieczysław Młynarski, 13 Zbigniew Bogucki, 14 Ryszard Prostak, 15 Krzysztof Fikiel (Coach: Jerzy Świątek)

1985 EuroBasket: finished 11th among 12 teams

4 Dariusz Zelig, 5 Dariusz Szczubiał, 6 Andrzej Żurawski, 7 Marek Sobczyński, 8 Jarosław Jęchorek, 9 Jerzy Bińkowski, 10 Ireneusz Mulak, 11 Justyn Węglorz, 12 Adam Fiedler, 13 Henryk Wardach, 14 Jarosław Zyskowski, 15 Krzysztof Fikiel (Coach: Andrzej Kuchar)

1987 EuroBasket: finished 7th among 12 teams

4 Dariusz Zelig, 5 Ryszard Prostak, 6 Mirosław Boryca, 7 Marek Sobczyński, 8 Jarosław Jęchorek, 9 Jerzy Bińkowski, 10 Dariusz Szczubiał, 11 Dariusz Kobylański, 12 Adam Fiedler, 13 Jerzy Kołodziejczak, 14 Henryk Wardach, 15 Krzysztof Fikiel (Coach: Andrzej Kuchar)

1991 EuroBasket: finished 7th among 8 teams

4 Dariusz Zelig, 5 Maciej Zieliński, 6 Wojciech Królik, 7 Piotr Baran, 8 Jarosław Marcinkowski, 9 Jerzy Bińkowski, 10 Dariusz Szczubiał, 11 Adam Wójcik, 12 Jarosław Jechorek, 13 Jacek Duda, 14 Mariusz Bacik, 15 Tomasz Torgowski (Coach: Arkadiusz Koniecki)

1997 EuroBasket: finished 7th among 16 teams

4 Robert Kościuk, 5 Andrzej Pluta, 6 Krzysztof Mila, 7 Jarosław Darnikowski, 8 Dominik Tomczyk, 9 Maciej Zieliński, 10 Adam Wójcik, 11 Tomasz Jankowski, 12 Piotr Szybilski, 13 Rafał Bigus, 14 Mariusz Bacik, 15 Krzysztof Dryja (Coach: Eugeniusz Kijewski)

2007 EuroBasket: finished 13th among 16 teams

4 Bartłomiej Wołoszyn, 5 Andrzej Pluta, 6 Robert Skibniewski, 7 Robert Witka, 8 Filip Dylewicz, 9 Radosław Hyży, 10 Adam Wójcik, 11 Kamil Pietras, 12 Szymon Szewczyk, 13 Iwo Kitzinger, 14 Przemysław Frasunkiewicz, 15 Łukasz Koszarek (Coach: Andrej Urlep)

2009 EuroBasket: finished 9th among 16 teams

4 Maciej Lampe, 5 Krzysztof Roszyk, 6 Michał Chyliński, 7 Krzysztof Szubarga, 8 Robert Skibniewski, 9 Szymon Szewczyk, 10 Adam Wójcik, 11 Michał Ignerski, 12 David Logan, 13 Marcin Gortat, 14 Robert Witka, 15 Łukasz Koszarek (Coach: Muli Katzurin)

2011 EuroBasket: finished 17th among 24 teams

4 Dardan Berisha, 5 Adam Łapeta, 6 Robert Skibniewski, 7 Adam Waczyński, 8 Piotr Pamuła, 9 Paweł Leończyk, 10 Szymon Szewczyk, 11 Thomas Kelati, 12 Piotr Szczotka, 13 Łukasz Wiśniewski, 14 Adam Hrycaniuk, 15 Łukasz Koszarek (Coach: Aleš Pipan)

2013 EuroBasket: finished 21st among 24 teams

4 Przemysław Karnowski, 5 Thomas Kelati, 6 Maciej Lampe, 7 Krzysztof Szubarga, 8 Michał Chyliński, 9 Przemysław Zamojski, 10 Mateusz Ponitka, 11 Michał Ignerski, 12 Adam Waczyński, 13 Marcin Gortat, 14 Adam Hrycaniuk, 15 Łukasz Koszarek (Coach: Dirk Bauermann)

2015 EuroBasket: finished 11th among 24 teams

0 Aleksander Czyż, 5 Aaron Cel, 6 A. J. Slaughter, 7 Damian Kulig, 10 Mateusz Ponitka, 12 Adam Waczyński, 13 Marcin Gortat (C), 15 Łukasz Koszarek, 17 Przemysław Zamojski, 24 Przemysław Karnowski, 33 Karol Gruszecki, 66 Robert Skibniewski (Coach: Mike Taylor)

2017 EuroBasket: finished 18th among 24 teams

3 Michał Sokołowski, 5 Aaron Cel, 6 A. J. Slaughter, 7 Damian Kulig, 8 Przemysław Zamojski, 9 Mateusz Ponitka, 12 Adam Waczyński, 15 Łukasz Koszarek, 21 Tomasz Gielo, 24 Przemek Karnowski, 33 Karol Gruszecki, 34 Adam Hrycaniuk (Coach: Mike Taylor)	

2019 FIBA World Cup: finished 8th among 32 teams

2 Aleksander Balcerowski, 3 Michał Sokołowski, 5 Aaron Cel, 6 A. J. Slaughter, 9 Mateusz Ponitka, 12 Adam Waczyński, 13 Dominik Olejniczak, 15 Kamil Łączyński, 33 Karol Gruszecki, 34 Adam Hrycaniuk, 55 Łukasz Koszarek, 77 Damian Kulig (Coach: Mike Taylor)

2022 EuroBasket: finished 4th among 24 teams

1 Jarosław Zyskowski, 2 Aleksander Balcerowski, 3 Michał Sokołowski, 5 Aaron Cel, 6 A. J. Slaughter, 9 Mateusz Ponitka (C), 10 Łukasz Kolenda, 11 Aleksander Dziewa, 13 Dominik Olejniczak, 23 Michał Michalak, 30 Jakub Garbacz, 55 Jakub Schenk (Coach: Igor Miličić)

Kit

Manufacturer
2011: Spalding
2013–15: Zina
2016–2021: Adidas
2022–present : 4F

Sponsor
2011: Prokom
2013: Lotto
2015: Tauron
2017: Energa

See also

Sport in Poland
Poland women's national basketball team
Poland men's national under-20 basketball team
Poland men's national under-19 basketball team
Poland men's national under-17 basketball team
Poland men's national 3x3 team
Bydgoszcz Basket Cup

References

External links

 
Poland FIBA profile 
Poland National Team – Men at Eurobasket.com
Poland Basketball Records at FIBA Archive

Videos
Slovenia v Poland – Highlights – EuroBasket 2022 (Quarter-finals) Youtube.com video

 
Basketball teams in Poland
Men's national basketball teams
1934 establishments in Poland